is a Japanese actress and model.

Career
In mid-2006, Honda entered the entertainment industry after being scouted by seven different people on the same day. She then debuted as an exclusive model for the magazine Seventeen in the same year. In 2007, she switched magazines, being an exclusive model for Love Berry. From January 2010 onwards, she switched again to Non-no.

From April 2012 to May 2013, she was the assistant of the TBS talk show A-Studio
hosted by Shōfukutei Tsurube II. In November 2012, she made her film debut by starring in the film Fashion Story: Model. In July 2013, she appeared as an MC on the late-night music show Music Dragon aired on NTV. She played the heroine in the Fuji TV getsuku drama Koinaka in July 2015.

Appearances

TV dramas
 Shima Shima Episode 5 (TBS, 2011), high school girl
 Celeb Party ni Ikō (BS-TBS, 2011), Tsubasa
 Renai Neet: Wasureta Koi no Hajimekata (TBS, 2012), Yui Kinoshita
 Strawberry Night Episode 3 (Fuji TV, 2012), high school girl
 Papadol Episode 2 (TBS, 2012), herself
 Kagi no Kakatta Heya Episode 10 and 11 (Fuji TV, 2012), Shinobu Kawamura
 My Daddy Is an Idol! Episode 2 (TBS, 2012), A-Studio" TV show presenter 
 GTO (KTV, 2012), Urumi Kanzaki
 Aki mo Oni Abare Special (2012)

 Piece (NTV, 2012), Mizuho Suga
 Shōgatsu Special! Fuyuyasumi mo Nekketsu Jugyō da (2013)
 Kanketsu-hen: Saraba Onizuka! Sotsugyō Special (2013)
 Tonbi (TBS, 2013), Kyō Matsumoto
 Vampire Heaven (TV Tokyo, 2013), Komachi
 Power Office Girls 2013 (Fuji TV, 2013), Shiori Maruyama
 Andō Lloyd: A.I. knows Love? (TBS, 2013), Sapuri
 Saikō no Omotenashi (NTV, 2014), Nana Momokawa
 Henshin (Wowow, 2014), Ryōko Kyōgoku
 Tokyo ni Olympic o Yonda Otoko (Fuji TV, 2014), Nina
 Kōhaku ga Umareta Hi (NHK, 2015), Mitsue Takeshita
 Yamegoku: Helpline Cop (TBS, 2015), Haruka Nagamitsu
 Koinaka (Fuji TV, 2015), Akari Serizawa
 Pretty Proofreader (NTV, 2016), Toyoko Morio
 Super Salaryman Mr. Saenai (NTV, 2017)
 Swimming in the Dark (TBS, 2017), Azusa Hada 
 Chūnen Superman Saenai Si Episode 5 (NTV, 2017), Fujisaki
 Caution, Hazardous Wife (NTV, 2017), Kyoko Sato
 Absolute Zero 3 (Fuji TV, 2018), Yui Odagiri
 Yuube wa Otanoshimi Deshita ne (TBS, MBS, 2019), Miyako Okamoto
 Radiation House (Fuji TV, 2019–2021), Anne Amakasu
 Secret × Warrior Phantomirage! (TV Tokyo, 2019), Kumachi
 Trap the Con Man (NTV, YTV, 2019), Saki Hoshino / Momo Kisaragi 
 Absolute Zero 4 (Fuji TV, 2020), Yui Odagiri
 Bullets, Bones and Blocked Noses (NHK, 2021), Yukina Kakizaki
 I Will Be Your Bloom (TBS, 2022), Asuka Nakamachi

Films
 Fashion Story: Model (2012), Hinako
 Rakugo Eiga "Life Rate" (2013)
 Enoshima Prism (2013), Michiru Andō
 It All Began When I Met You (2013), Natsumi Ōtomo in "Christmas no Yūki"
 Nishino Yukihiko no Koi to Bōken (2014), Kanoko
 Blue Spring Ride (2014), Futaba Yoshioka
 Terminal (2015), Atsuko Shīna
 Night's Tightrope (2016), Yuki Sakurai
 The Mole Song: Hong Kong Capriccio (2016), Karen
 Fullmetal Alchemist (2017), Winry Rockbell
 Color Me True (2018), Tōko Naruse
 Aircraft Carrier Ibuki (2019)
 The Journalist (2019)
 Weathering with You (2019), Natsumi (voice)
 Tom and Sawyer in the City (2021), Reia Washio
 Radiation House: The Movie (2022), Anne Amakasu
 Fullmetal Alchemist: The Revenge of Scar (2022), Winry Rockbell
 Fullmetal Alchemist: The Final Alchemy (2022), Winry Rockbell

Web dramas
 Shinikare (NOTTV, 2012), Marika
 Gozen 3-ji no Muhōchitai (BeeTV, 2013), Momoko Nanase
 Chase (Amazon Video, 2017), Mai Aizawa
 Chase 2 (Amazon Prime, 2018), Mai Aizawa

Dubbing
 Taka no Tsume 7: Jōō Heika no Jōbūbu (2014), Mutsumi Kihara

Commercials
 Sony Computer Entertainment - PlayStation 3 (2006)
 Baskin Robbins - Satiwan Ice Cream (2007)
 KDDI - au 1seg (2007)
 Odakyu Electric Railway (2008)
 Toyota - Toyota Sai (2009)
 Dydo Drinco - Dydo Blend Coffee (2011-2012)
 NOTTV (2012)
 East Japan Railway Company
 TYO Thank You 25 Campaign (2012-2013)
 JR Ski Ski (2012)
 Mark Styler Runway Channel (2012-2013)
 Ichikura Ondine (2012)
 Hoya Healthcare - Eye City (2012-2013)
 Honda
 Kurumatching (2012)
 Sensing (2015)
 Pitat House Network (2012-)
 Japan Construction Occupational Safety and Health Association (2012-2013)
 Kyocera - Honey Bee (2012-2013)
 House Wellness Foods - C1000 (2013-)
 Bourbon - Fettuccine Gummy (2013)
 Kao
 Biore Sarasara Powder Sheet (2013-)
 Cape (2013)
 Marshmallow Whip (2014-)
 Nintendo - Mario & Luigi: Dream Team (2013)
 Aflac - Chanto Kotaeru Medical Insurance Ever/Ladies' Ever (2013)
 Kanebo Cosmetics - Lavshuca (2013)
 Yahoo Japan (2014)
 Nikon
 Nikon 1 J4 (2014)
 Nikon Coolpix S6900 (2014)
 Nikon 1 J5 (2015)
 ABC Mart
 Puma×ABC Mart Campaign Special Movie "Everyday is Special" (2014)
 Converse (2014)
 Nuovo Cool White Sandal (2015)
 Recruit - Trabāyu (2014)
 Gloops - Skylock (2014)
 Asahi Breweries - Clear Asahi (2015)
 Square Enix - Hoshi no Dragon Quest

Music videos
 B'z - Eien no Tsubasa (May 9, 2007)
 Base Ball Bear
 Short Hair (August 31, 2011)
 Perfect Blue (February 13, 2013)
 JaaBourBonz - Chikau yo (December 14, 2011)
 Ms.Oooja - Be... (February 29, 2012)
 Ikimono-gakari - Kirari (December 24, 2014)

Radio
 School of Lock! (Tokyo FM, December 9, 2014)

Bibliography

Magazines
 Seventeen, Shueisha 1967-, as an exclusive model from 2006
 Love Berry, Tokuma Shoten 2001–2012, as an exclusive model from January 2007 to 2008
 Jille, Futabasha 2001–2014, September 2008 to December 2009
 Non-no, Shueisha 1971-, as an exclusive model from January 2010
 Myōjō, Shueisha 1952-, December 2012-
 Men's Non-No, Shueisha 1986-, April 2015-

Photobooks
 Hondarake Hondabon (October 13, 2013), SDP,

References

External links

  
 
 Stardust Promotion Honda Tsubasa Official Blog "Bassanchi" 
 

Japanese television actresses
Japanese television personalities
Living people
1992 births
Actresses from Tokyo
Japanese female models
Stardust Promotion artists
Models from Tokyo Metropolis